Compsosoma nubilum is a species of beetle in the family Cerambycidae. It was described by Gounelle in 1908. It is known from Bolivia, Brazil and Paraguay.

References

Compsosomatini
Beetles described in 1908